Pitt was launched at Ulverston in 1799 and proceeded to sail to the West Indies and New York. A French privateer captured her in 1806 but she quickly returned to British ownership and sailing as a West Indiaman. She continued trading with the West Indies and North America until she was last listed in 1833.

Career
Pitt first appeared in Lloyd's Register (LR), in 1800.

On 8 August 1803 Captain Daniel Campbell acquired a letter of marque.

Pitt had five men killed and several wounded before she struck her colours. Jeune Adele sent Pitt into Guadeloupe. The LR volume for 1808 carried the annotation "captured" by Pitts name. However, the same volume lists Pitt, of 308 tons (bm), launched in Ulvereston, with launch year of 1800. This Pitt did not appear in earlier volumes of LR or the Register of Shipping, suggesting the two vessels are the same, and that in a manner still obscure Pitt returned to British hands, though with a different master and owners.

On 27 February 1810 Captain Robert Hathornthwaite acquired a letter of marque.

On 13 August Pitt, Hawthornthwaite, master, was at Liverpool, having returned from Dominica, when a gale drove her and several other ships on shore. All were later refloated, having sustained only slight damage.

Captain William Denning acquired a letter of marque of 19 December 1811.

Fate
Pitt was last listed in LR in 1834 with data unchanged from 1833 with data unchanged from 1830. She may have transferred to Air, but confirming details are lacking.

Citations

1799 ships
Ships built in England
Age of Sail merchant ships of England
Captured ships
Maritime incidents in 1810